Dompierre-sur-Héry is a former commune in the Nièvre department in central France. On 1 January 2016, it was merged into the commune Beaulieu.

Demographics
On 1 January 2019, the estimated population was 71.

See also
Communes of the Nièvre department

References

Former communes of Nièvre
Populated places disestablished in 2016